Takifugu porphyreus, known as the purple puffer, is a species of pufferfish in the family Tetraodontidae. It is native to the Northwest Pacific, where it ranges from Hokkaido to the East China Sea. It is a demersal species found in the littoral zone that reaches 52 cm (20.5 inches) in total length. While parts of the fish are highly toxic, it is frequently consumed as fugu in Japan.

References 

porphyreus
Fish described in 1850